This article lists the current and former cathedrals of the main Christian churches in Ireland. Since the main denominations are organised on an all-Ireland basis, this article includes information about both jurisdictions: Northern Ireland and the Republic of Ireland.

Overview
It is a commonly held perception that the term 'cathedral' may be applied to any particularly large or grand church. Whilst many cathedrals may be such, this is due to their ecclesiastical status (such a church is grand because it is a cathedral, rather than it being a cathedral because of its grandeur). A cathedral may therefore be a smaller building, particularly where they exist in sparser or poorer communities. Modern cathedrals may lack the grandeur of former times, focussing on the functional aspect of a place of worship, though it should be borne in mind that many of the grand and ancient cathedrals of today were originally built to a much smaller plan, and have been successively extended and rebuilt over the centuries. Some cathedrals were purpose-built as such, whilst others were formerly parochial, or parish churches, subsequently promoted in status due to ecclesiastical requirements such as periodic diocesan reorganisation.

Essentially, a cathedral church is a Christian place of worship that is the chief, or 'mother' church of an episcopal see and is distinguished as such by being the location for the cathedra or bishop's seat. Strictly speaking therefore, only those Christian denominations with an Episcopal polity possess cathedrals. However, the label 'cathedral' remains in common parlance for notable churches which were formerly part of an episcopal denomination, such as may be the case with some Scottish churches which are now within the Presbyterian Church of Scotland (see List of cathedrals in Scotland). In addition, former cathedrals which may now be in a ruined state, retain their nominal status.

The following list comprises, for the Republic of Ireland and Northern Ireland, all locations of a current cathedral church, or former cathedral church, as well as those locations where no trace remains of the structure, indeed where the precise location is no longer known.

Also included are those structures or sites of intended cathedrals as well as pro-cathedrals (churches serving as an interim cathedral), for instance, whilst a permanent cathedral is acquired, or (as a co-cathedral where the diocesan demographics/geography requires the bishop's seat to be shared with a building in an alternate location).

The inclusion of the entire island of Ireland is strictly for ecclesiastical reasons.  Northern Ireland is represented because, although it politically comprises part of the United Kingdom, ecclesiastically the island comprises a single geographically based unit.

In the list which follows the cathedrals are listed by denomination and (where applicable) denominational hierarchy.  Disused establishments are listed separately.

The geographical co-ordinates provided are sourced from details provided by Ordnance Survey Ireland.

Terms not covered in the above preamble include translated, which is the move of a bishop's seat from one location to another, moving cathedral status from the former church and bestowing it on the destination church, such as may occur in a diocesan or provincial re-organisation.

Abbreviations and Key
 + indicates non-cathedral ecclesiastical use.
 NM = National Monument.

Listing of establishments

Catholic Church

Province of Armagh

Province of Cashel

Province of Dublin

Province of Tuam

Church of Ireland

Province of Armagh

Province of Dublin

Former cathedrals
With some exceptions, these former cathedrals were established prior to the Reformation in Ireland and the subsequent transfer of Church assets to the Established church. Most had ceased to be cathedrals prior to the establishment of the Church of Ireland.

See also
List of basilicas in Ireland
List of cathedrals in the United Kingdom
List of English cathedrals
List of abbeys and priories
Abbeys and priories in the Republic of Ireland
Abbeys and priories in Scotland
Abbeys and priories in Wales
Abbeys and priories in England
Abbeys and priories in Isle of Man
Abbeys and priories in Northern Ireland
List of monasteries dissolved by Henry VIII of England
Dissolution of the Monasteries

References

External links
List of Cathedrals in Ireland and Great Britain by GCatholic.org
Cathedrals and Churches of Ireland by Cathedrals and Churches of Ireland

History of Christianity in Ireland
Cathedrals in Ireland
Cathedrals in Northern Ireland
Cathedrals in the Republic of Ireland
Cathedrals
Ireland, Cathedrals
Cathedrals